Kainuu people (Finnish: kainuulaiset) are Eastern Finnish inhabitants of the Kainuu region.

Kainuu was settled by Savonians in the 16th century but historically belonged to Ostrobothnia County and Oulu Province. This allowed for a separate Kainuu identity to emerge in the late 19th century.

Kainuu people speak the Kainuu dialect, which is a part of the Savonian dialects of Finnish. Kainuu people are sometimes considered to be Savonians. However, Kainuu people themselves do not think so but have a separate Kainuu identity.

Most Kainuu people are Lutherans.

Name 

Originally, the area of Kainuu was called Oulujärvi municipality (Oulujärven pitäjä), and later Kajaani Province (Kajaanin lääni). Kajaani is the name of the largest town in Kainuu, although Kainuu is still called "Kajanaland" in Swedish (and the Kainuu people "kajanaländare").

In the 17th century, the term Kainuu, which was previously used to refer to the coasts of Ostrobothnia, was first used to refer to the area of modern-day Kainuu. In 1663, the provost of Paltamo Johannes Cajanus referred to the inhabitants of Paltamo and Sotkamo ("Cainoa") as "cainolaiset". However, this term didn't gain wider usage at the time.

In the early 20th century, when the Kainuu identity was forming, multiple names were used for the region, such as Kainuu, Kainuunmaa (land of Kainuu), Korpi-Kainuu (Wilderness Kainuu), Nälkämaa (Hunger land) and Ylimaa (Upper land). Eventually the name Kainuu, which was supported, for example, by the local newspaper Kainuun Sanomat, became the standard. In the newspaper, Kainuu people were usually called Kainuun kansa (the people/nation of Kainuu). Other terms used included kyntäjäväki (plowing people), talonpoikaiskansa (peasant people), korpiloukkojen kansa (people of wilderness hollows), and Kalevan heimo (tribe of Kaleva).

The etymological origin of the word Kainuu is unknown. Theories include kainu/kaino ’lowlands’ from Germanic (like Swedish dialectical hven ’wetland’), kainus ’knob-headed staff, wedge-shaped object’, a Sámi origin (South Sámi gaajnuo, gaajnuoladdje ’peasant (non-Sámi)’, Lule Sámi kai´nōlatj ’Swedish coastal peasant’, in a non-specified Swedish Sámi language kainolats, kainahaljo ’Swedish or Norwegian peasant’), or a connection to Old Icelandic kveinir, kvænir, kuen(n)er ’a North Scandinavian people, likely Finnish’ and Nynorsk kvæn ’Kven, Finnish’.

History

16th century
In the turn of the 16th century, there were no fast settlements or villages in Kainuu. However, the Kainuu wilds were still used by few nomadic Sámi, as well as Ostrobothnians and Karelians, to fish and hunt. Savonians started moving to Kainuu in the 1550s, encouraged by the Swedish king Gustav Vasa. They practised slash-and-burn agriculture. Since the Treaty of Nöteborg in 1323, the area had belonged to Russia, and the Swedish rulers wanted to increase the Finnish presence in the area for political reasons. In the coming decades, Russians tried to get rid of the Swedish settlements that had spread to their lands by raiding and destroying Kainuu villages and murdering the men, women and children. This period, which was a part of a larger border conflict between Sweden and Russia, is known to Kainuu people as rappasodat (pillaging wars), during which the Finns of North Ostrobothnia and Kainuu and the Karelians of White Karelia practised guerrilla warfare against each other. After the Russo-Swedish War of 1590–1595, in the Treaty of Teusina in 1595, Kainuu was made a part of the Kingdom of Sweden, ending the border conflict. Many Savonian families were again encouraged or forced by the order of the king to move to Kainuu. By the end of the century, Paltaniemi had become the center of the rural municipality.

17th–18th centuries

As a result of the war, Kainuu was made a part of the Ostrobothnia County. Between 1650 and 1680, the region gained remarkable administrative improvements under the ownership of Count Per Brahe, which resulted in the region being led fairly independently. The town of Kajaani was founded to be the center of this fiefdom, the leader of which lived in the Kajaani Castle. The initiative for the building of the castle was put forward by Klemetti Eerikinpoika, who was a Kainuu war leader from the era of rappasodat. As a result of this time period, people kept calling Kainuu "Kajaani Province", even though it was not its own province at all, but still a part of Ostrobothnia. However, it got to keep its civil administrative system, remaining as its own hundred. At the end of the 17th century, there was a drop in population due to hunger. The people suffered again in the early 18th century during the Russian military occupation of Finland during the Great Northern War, during which the Kajaani Castle was destroyed.

19th–20th centuries

In the 19th century, the tar industry became incredibly important for the people of Kainuu, as Kainuu was the center of the industry in Finland. Although a bit of Kainuu folk poetry had already been collected in the 18th century, the popularity of national romanticism in the 19th century brought further attention to Kainuu. This included collecting folk poetry of pagan origin that had survived in oral tradition, such as spells and tales involving mythological figures like Väinämöinen and Lemminkäinen. At the turn of the 20th century, the region was made known by Kainuu author Ilmari Kianto and poet Eino Leino, who is considered a national poet of Finland. Kainuu came to be known as the land of tar, bark bread and hunger. At the same time, the Kainuu identity was forming, and the word "Kainuu" became the primary word to refer to the region.

During the Winter War, the Soviet Union tried to split Finland in half by going through Kainuu to Oulu. This advance was stopped by Finns in the Battle of Suomussalmi.

Dialect 

Kainuu people speak the Kainuu dialect which is one of the Savonian dialects of Finnish. It differs from other Savonian dialects in its vocabulary which has been heavily influenced by Central and Northern Ostrobothnian dialects.

One common feature in the dialect is diphthong reduction: Kaenuu ("Kainuu").

Example from Puolanka:
No niitähän sitä oesin niitä savottareissuja kyllä, kyllä palijoo mitä on, on siellä pohjosessae ´asennoitu. Sellaisissa niin kurjissa oloissa että ihtesäp pitänys saunat lämmitteä ja puu laittoas siihe ja, kiuassaona. Siellä ulukona sittä värjötelläl lämppiysaeka jos kuim pakkane on. Ja siellä, saonan eessä keitteäk kahvesak keittosa, tuiskussa pakkasessa. No sittä kun ne on niin täynnä ett_ei sovil liikkumaan. Moatar ruvet-, ruvettii yhelläek kämpällä ni, kur rupesi kerran kylellee – no ei oov vara keäntyös selälleen se oli niin täysi. Ja kylymä. Voatteet kylymetty peä alla.

In standard Finnish:
No niitähän sitä olisin niitä savottareissuja kyllä, kyllä paljon mitä on, on siellä pohjoisessakin asennoitu. Sellaisissa niin kurjissa oloissa, että itse pitänyt saunat lämmittää ja puu laittaa siihen, ja kiuassauna. Siellä ulkona sitä värjötellä lämmitysaika jos kuinka pakkanen on. Ja siellä saunan edessä keittää kahvinsa, keittonsa, tuiskussa, pakkasessa. No sitten kun ne ovat niin täynnä, ettei sovi liikkumaan. Maata ruvet-, ruvettiin yhdelläkin kämpällä, niin kun rupesi kerran kyljelleen – no ei ole varaa kääntyä selälleen, se oli niin täysi. Ja kylmä. Vaatteet jäätyivät pään alla.

Culture 
See: Kainuu#Tourism and culture.

Descriptions 

In the late 19th century and early 20th century, Kainuu was a poor region that had often suffered from famines. Kainuu got a reputation of being a "hunger land", which is reflected in the regional anthem of Kainuu, Nälkämaan laulu ("Song of the Hunger Land"). It was seen as a harsh place to live. On the other hand, these descriptions praised the striking nature of Kainuu, as well as the strength and sisu of the Kainuu people. Kainuu people have been described as honest, hard-working, quiet, independent, calm, lacking confidence, uncertain, polite, hospitable, and complaining. Bragging has traditionally been seen as a negative trait, possibly a factor in causing the perceived large amount of complaining instead. Kainuu people are also seen as being proud of their homeland and feeling a strong connection to it.

Authors from Kainuu have played a part in creating the impressions of Kainuu and its people. Author Ilmari Kianto, from Suomussalmi, often described the poor conditions of the Kainuu wilderness. Author Veikko Huovinen, from Sotkamo, described nature.

A letter sent to the newspaper Uusi Häme in 1938 by an anonymous girl from Kainuu described the Kainuu identity thus: "-- we, the current inhabitants of Kainuu would like to be our own tribe, even though we are a mix of Karelians and Savonians, possibly other tribes as well. -- A Kainuu person has a quiet and introverted personality. If you want to get to know them, they need to be approached, because a Kainuu person will not take the initiative in that matter. They will become friendly and warm when they consider the stranger their friend. -- If you understand a Kainuu person as sweet and ingenuous, you'll make friends that will never forget you."

Cuisine

The most important ingredients in traditional Kainuu food are fish, game (especially fowl), berries (especially blueberries, lingonberries and cloudberries), milk, butter, meat and blood. Most popular crops were barley, turnip and rye. Potato farming was also started relatively early. Mushrooms were not used in traditional Kainuu cuisine but have found their way on the plates of modern Kainuu people. During times of famine, people resorted to using tree bark (pettu) as an ingredient. Enough meat was saved to make it last through the winter, whereas milk was not always available. Bread also has an important role.

Kainuu houses traditionally had Eastern Finnish style ovens which food was prepared in, resulting in a wide variety of pies (teos), soft bread, kukko (fillings baked inside a loaf of bread) and other oven-made foods. Everyday food included fish or meat, and various kinds of soups (velli) were common. Finer foods for special occasions included talkkuna (talakkuna), roast, cardamom bread (nisu), juustoleipä, viili and rieska. Coffee was and is a popular drink.

Some foods traditional to Kainuu include rönttönen, juustoleipä, pöysti (meal made with beef, pork and lamb), ryynikukko (native Kainuu version of Karelian pasty), rye bread, potato milk (pottumaito), blood sausages, barley rieska, potato rieska, potato pie (pottuteos), various kinds of soups such as vendace and other fish soups, turnip and milk soup and sheep soup, various kinds of kukko such as kalakukko, open kukko, turnip and rutabaga kukko and potato kukko, as well as berry porridge and many other kinds of porridges, and cheeses.

National dresses and textiles

National dresses in Finland are reconstructed from 18th and 19th century festive clothing used by commoners. The following national dresses have been reconstructed and officially recognized from Kainuu: Kainuu dress for women, Kainuu suit for men, and Suomussalmi dress for women.

The sewing patterns were checked for historical accuracy by craft teacher Eila Parviainen, applied arts bachelor Minna Meriläinen and homemade craft teacher Marja-Leena Pahkala. Kainuu men's national suit was officially accepted in 2001. Suomussalmi women's national dress was designed by Tyyni Vahter in 1953 based on materials collected by Selma Juntunen. One basis for the dress were 's descriptions of the Southern Lapland dress as it was based on a vest found from Hyrynsalmi.

Peilikäs is a raanu pattern which has become a symbol of Kainuu textile tradition. Originally used in blankets, it later spread to decorations such as pillowcases, carpets and sweaters.

Festivals
The Finnish harvest festival Kekri is celebrated in Kainuu. Up until the early 20th century, Kekri was a more important holiday than Christmas. Christmas was seen more as a celebration of the upper classes, and Kekri held a meaning for the peasants. It was celebrated at the end of the harvest and included elements such as dressing up, fortune telling for the coming year, and burning bonfires. Due to urbanization, Kekri lost its importance, and many of the Kekri traditions have moved to now widely celebrated Christmas and New Year. The Finnish Father Christmas figure, Joulupukki, has his origins in a character called Kekripukki. Regardless of this, Kekri celebrations are still organized in Kainuu. Kajaani has been holding a Kekri celebration annually since 2002. This includes the burning of a Kekri goat (giant goat made out of straw), as well as music performances, art shows, catering, children's activities, markets, and other events depending on the year. The heavy metal concert KekriFest has also been held, for the first time in 2019.

Genetics
In Kainuu, Y-chromosomal (male lineage) haplogroup N1c1 has been observed with the frequency of 78%, and haplogroup I1 with 12.4%. The mitochondrial (mtDNA, female lineage) haplogroups with highest frequencies are H and U.

Famous Kainuu people
Daniel Cajanus, giant
Anders Chydenius, philosopher
Veikko Huovinen, author
Joonas Kemppainen, ice hockey player
Marko Kemppainen, skeet shooter
Ilmari Kianto, author
Heikki Kovalainen, Formula 1 driver
Anne Kyllönen, cross-country skier
Merja Kyllönen, politician
Jenna Laukkanen, swimmer
Eino Leino, author and poet
Laura Malmivaara, actress
Väinö Markkanen, sports shooter
Kaisa Mäkäräinen, biathlete
Riku Nieminen, actor
Janne Pesonen, ice hockey player
Osmo Tapio Räihälä, composer
Johan Gabriel Ståhlberg, priest
K. J. Ståhlberg, 1st President of Finland

Notes

References
Väisänen, Heino (1998). Kainuun kansan waiheita vv. 1500 – 1900. Gummerus Kirjapaino Oy. .
Helo, Maria (2006). Kainuulaisuus – Omakuva ja alueellinen identiteetti. University of Joensuu.
Jutikkala, Eino; Pirinen, Kauko (2002). Suomen historia. Sixth edition. WSOY. .
Mäkinen, Antti (editor, 2002). Elämää Kainuussa – Kainuun asutus 450 vuotta. Kainuun museo.
Keränen, Jorma (1986). Kainuun historia I. "Uudisraivauksen ja rajasotien kausi". Kainuun Sanomain Kirjapaino Oy.

Ethnic groups in Finland
Kainuu